The Broro River is a  tidal arm of the Sapelo River in McIntosh County, Georgia, in the United States.

See also
List of rivers of Georgia

References 

USGS Hydrologic Unit Map - State of Georgia (1974)

Rivers of Georgia (U.S. state)
Rivers of McIntosh County, Georgia